The 2004 World Orienteering Championships, the 21st World Orienteering Championships, were held in Västerås, Sweden, 11 –19 September 2004.

The championships had eight events; sprint for men and women, middle distance for men and women, long distance (formerly called individual or classic distance) for men and women, and relays for men and women.

Medalists

References 

World Orienteering Championships
World Orienteering Championships
International sports competitions hosted by Sweden
World Orienteering Championships
Orienteering in Sweden
Sports competitions in Västerås